Hush Money is the 26th book in Robert B. Parker's  Spenser series and first published in 1999.

Spenser investigates university politics when Robinson Nevins is denied university tenure.

References

Spenser (novel series)
1999 American novels
American detective novels